Haykanoush Danielyan (15 December 1893 – 19 April 1958) was an Armenian and Soviet opera singer (soprano) and music educator. Danielyan was the first Armenian singer who was awarded the title of People's Artist of the USSR (1939).

Biography 
Haykanush Danielyan was born in Tiflis. In 1920 she graduated from the Petrograd Conservatory. In 1920-1932 she sang in the opera theaters of Petrograd and Tiflis. In 1924, together with the singers Levon Isetsky and Shara Talyan, she participated in the performances of Leninakan opera group and performed with concerts.

In 1941-1951 she taught at Komitas State Conservatory of Yerevan. In 1949-1952 she was the director of the Pyotr Tchaikovsky musical school. Since 1932 she had been a soloist at the Yerevan Opera and Ballet Theater. In 1941, she starred in the film "Armenian Film-Concert" shot at "Yerevan" TV studio.

Haykanoush Danielyan had performed songs and romances from Armenian and foreign composers: Pyotr Ilyich Tchaikovsky, Nikolai Rimsky-Korsakov, Sergei Rachmaninoff, Alexander Glazunov.

Member of the Communist Party of the Soviet Union since 1941. Member of parliament of Supreme Soviet of the Soviet Union for 2 convocation (1946-1950), Member of parliament of the Supreme Soviet of the Armenian SSR of the 1st and 3rd convocations.

Legacy

 The School of Art in Yerevan's Nor-Nork administrative district is named after Haykanoush Danielyan.
 In 2000, a postage stamp of Armenia dedicated to Danielyan was issued.

Performances

Awards
 People's Artist of the USSR (1939)
 Stalin Prize
 Order of Lenin
 Order of the Red Banner of Labour
 Medal "For Valiant Labour in the Great Patriotic War 1941–1945"

Gallery

References

External links

ДАНИЭЛЯН Айкануш Багдасаровна
Даниэлян Айкануш Багдасаровна

1893 births
1958 deaths
20th-century Armenian women opera singers
Soviet women opera singers
Musicians from Tbilisi
Communist Party of the Soviet Union members
Academic staff of the Komitas State Conservatory of Yerevan
Saint Petersburg Conservatory alumni
Second convocation members of the Supreme Soviet of the Soviet Union
People's Artists of the USSR
Stalin Prize winners
Recipients of the Order of Lenin
Recipients of the Order of the Red Banner of Labour
Armenian operatic sopranos
Soviet Armenians
Soviet music educators
Soviet sopranos